Journalist leads are an opening lead convention in the game of contract bridge. The method is designed to solve some problems with traditional agreements regarding opening leads. It bears some resemblance to Rusinow leads but differences exist. Journalist leads were advocated and publicized in 1964–1965 by The Bridge Journal  and were written under the name Journalist, which meant that they were a compilation of the opinions of the entire editorial staff of the magazine. (The Bridge Journal ceased publication in 1968 when its editor, Jeff Rubens, joined the editorial staff of The Bridge World.)

Not only do Journalist leads attempt to show what the opening leader has, but may also request the partner of opening leader to take specific actions, such as unblocking.

There are entirely different leads against notrump and suit contracts.

Against notrump contracts:

 A = demands unblock or count
 K = normal from AK or KQ
 Q = from QJ, KQ10, AQ10, or AQJ; demands J
 J = from J10; denies higher honor
 10 = from Q109, K109, A109, KJ10 or AJ10
 9 = from 109; denies higher honor
 relatively high spot = discourages continuation of suit
 relatively low spot = encourages continuation of suit

The proposed advantage of Journalist leads is shown in this deal:

When West leads the Jack his partner may win the Ace and switch to another suit.  When the 10 is led East will know to return the suit.

Rusinow leads from honor sequences are used against suit contracts.  If leading a spot card and wanting to give count, the lowest card was led from an odd number of cards and the third best was led from an even number of cards; if leading from a worthless holding and not wanting to give count, the highest card you could afford was led.

See also
Rule of 10-12
Rusinow leads

External links
BridgeGuys description of Journalist Leads

References

Contract bridge leads